Timothy Ruggles (March 7, 1776 – February 21, 1831) was a merchant, farmer and political figure in Nova Scotia. He represented Granville township in the Nova Scotia House of Assembly from 1818 to 1831.

He was born in Granville, Nova Scotia, the son of Timothy Ruggles and the grandson of the loyalist general Timothy Ruggles(who  died in Nova Scotia). He married Jane, the daughter of Edward Thorne. Ruggles was a partner in business with his nephew Stephen S. Thorne, who later also represented Granville in the provincial assembly.

References 
 Calnek, W. A. History of the County of Annapolis, Nova Scotia : Including Old Port Royal & Acadia (1999)

1776 births
1831 deaths
Nova Scotia pre-Confederation MLAs